George Vivian may refer to:

 George Vivian (artist) (1798–1873), English traveller and topographical artist
 George Vivian, 4th Baron Vivian (1878–1940), British soldier
 George Vivian (sport shooter) (1872–1936), Canadian shooter